Luiz Mattar defeated Jamie Morgan 6–4, 3–6, 6–3 to win the 1994 America's Red Clay Tennis Championships singles event. Todd Martin was the defending champion.

Seeds

  Todd Martin (first round)
  Ivan Lendl (quarterfinals)
  MaliVai Washington (second round)
  Wally Masur (first round)
  Jakob Hlasek (first round)
  Luiz Mattar (champion)
  Jamie Morgan (final)
  Mark Woodforde (semifinals)

Draw

Finals

Section 1

Section 2

External links
 1994 International Tennis Championships draw

Singles
Delray Beach Open